Ammeline (4,6-diamino-2-hydroxy-1,3,5-triazine) is a triazine derivative. It is the hydrolysis product of melamine.

Synthesis
Ammeline can be synthesized by the pyrolysis of urea or the condensation reaction among 2 moles of dicyandiamide and 1 mole of biuret.
 2 C2H4N4 + C2H5N3O2 → 2C3H5N5O + NH3

Chemical properties

Ammeline is weakly acidic with pKa ~9.  It can form nitrate, sulfate, chromate, and oxalate salts.  Ammeline reacts with boiling dilute hydrochloric acid to form melem and ammonia.

Ammeline is the first step in melamine hydrolysis.  Further hydrolysis (e.g. boiling ammeline with dilute alkali) yields ammelide.

References

 

Triazines
Aromatic amines